Vedam Venkataraya Sastry (21 December 1853 – 18 June 1929) was a Sanskrit and Telugu language poet, critic, Telugu theatre star and dramatist. He is known for providing authoritative editions of Sanskrit and Telugu classics.

Education and career
He was born to Venkataramana Sastry and Lakshmamma in Madras in 1853. He graduated with a B.A. in 1887. He had worked as a Sanskrit pandit in Madras Christian College for 25 years.

He wrote original drama and translated Sanskrit dramas of Kalidasa and Harsha. He established a dramatic association named Andhra Bhashabhimani Nataka Samajam in 1899. His original works include Prataparudriya natakam (Prataparudra's Play) in 1897 and Usha natakam (Usha's Play) in 1901. The former won a great reputation as a historical drama for introducing a Chanakyan-type character in Yugandhara, minister of the Kakatiya king Prataparudra, and for its patrochita bhasha. It recreated Prataparudra's grandeur and created other memorable roles like Vidyanatha the poet, Chekumuki Sastry the courtier, and the simple Perigadu and Yelli, who became synonymous in Telugu theatre with rustic humour. He worked as Chief editor of Suryarayandhra Nighantuvu in 1916. He died in 1929 in Madras.

Literary works
Naganandamu (1891)
Shakuntalamu (1896)
Prataparudriya Natakam (1897)
Usha Parinayam Natakam (1901)
Vikramorvashiyam (1901)
Nannechoduni Kavitvamu.
Pushpabana Vilasa
Visandhi Vivekamu (1912)
Bobbili Yuddham (1916)
Malavikagni Mitramu (1919)
Tikkana Somayaji Vijayamu (1919)
Uttararama Charitra (1920)
Andhra Sahitya Darpanamu
Vyāmōhamu
Tānāṣā, Akkanna Mādannalu
Telun̐guvārevaru - Parishodhana vyasamu
Mayasabha (Duryodhana)
Vēdamu Vēṅkaṭarāyaśāstrulavāri jīvitacaritra saṅgrahamu
Rasamanjari (1950)

Honors
 1920 : Mahamahopadhyaya award by Andhra Mahasabha.
 1922 : Sarvatantra svatantra, Mahamahopadhyaya and Vidyadanavrata mahoradhi facilitations by Sankara of Dwaraka Peetham.
 1927 : Kalaprapoorna by Andhra Viswakala Parishad. He was the first recipient of that honor.
 1958 : Andhra Pradesh Sahitya Akademi award for his critical analysis on Nanne Choda's prabandha poetry in 1958.

References

Telugu people
Indian male dramatists and playwrights
1853 births
1929 deaths
Indian theatre directors
Indian arts administrators
University of Madras alumni
19th-century Indian dramatists and playwrights
20th-century Indian dramatists and playwrights
Telugu-language dramatists and playwrights
Writers from Chennai
19th-century Indian male writers
Male actors in Telugu theatre
19th-century Indian male actors
20th-century Indian male actors
Male actors from Chennai
Dramatists and playwrights from Tamil Nadu
20th-century Indian male writers
Andhra movement